The Kabompo Ferry is a vehicle pontoon ferry at the Kabompo River near the village of Watopa, approx. 60 km east of the river mouth to Zambezi River.
The Kabompo River is dividing the Western and North-Western Provinces of Zambia. 

The ferry with a 25-tonne capacity serves the D557 road, a main north-south gravel road connection in western Zambia, from Lukulu, Kaoma and Mongu in Western Province to Kabompo, Zambezi town and Mwinilunga in North-Western Province. If the ferry is not operating, the only alternative to reach the other bank is a detour of about 900 km via Kasempa in the east.

It is a manually powered cable ferry, propelled by pulling on the steel cables which anchor it to each bank of the 100 m wide river. The workers stand on the ferry and use wooden clubs to grasp the cable — each club has a groove cut in it which attaches to the cable and by moving the club like a paddle, half a dozen men can pull the pontoon across the river, This system is used on other pontoon ferries in Zambia such as the Kafue Ferry north of Chirundu and the Chambeshi Ferry at Mbesuma.

References 

 Denis Tweddle: "Surveys of the Upper Zambezi River system" in Ichthos, Newsletter of the Friends of the South African Institute for Aquatic Biodiversity, Issue Number 74, June 2004.

Kabompo River
Ferries of Zambia